Hollywood Casino Gulf Coast (formerly Casino Magic Bay St. Louis) is a casino hotel complex in Bay St. Louis, Mississippi, owned by Gaming and Leisure Properties and operated by Penn Entertainment.

History 

The property was first opened by Casino Magic Corp. as Casino Magic Bay St. Louis, which was largely destroyed by Hurricane Katrina. The ballroom at Casino Magic hosted the Heroes of Wrestling Pay-per-view in 1999 as well as two Ultimate Fighting Championship events UFC 15 and UFC 19.

Penn National Gaming (now Penn Entertainment) bought it from Pinnacle Entertainment in 2002 and renamed it Hollywood in 2006.

External links
 
 Former Casino Magic website

References

1992 establishments in Mississippi
Buildings and structures in Hancock County, Mississippi
Casinos completed in 1992
Casinos in Mississippi
Hotels in Mississippi
Hotel buildings completed in 1992
Tourist attractions in Hancock County, Mississippi
Casino hotels
Sports in Bay St. Louis, Mississippi